Park Seo-yang (korean:박서양 朴瑞陽, September 30, 1885 – December 15, 1940) was a Korean early modern surgeon, doctor, chemist, and independence activist from a slave family. His real name was Bongchul (봉출) or Bongchuri (봉주리).

See also 
 Severance college
 Shin Eung-hee
 Yun Chi-wang
 Hong Seok-hoo

External links 
 Park Seo-yang 
 박서양, 한국 최초 서양의 알고보니 ‘백정 자식’ 애달픈 사연 
 의사 출신 독립운동가 신창희·박서양 선생 – 청년의사 08.08.15 
 한국 최초 의사 박서양의 독립운동 행적 밝혀낸 박형우 – 시민연합뉴스 07.03.26

References 

Korean independence activists
Korean chemists
1885 births
1940 deaths
Korean scientists
Korean educators
Korean surgeons
20th-century Korean scientists
20th-century Korean physicians